Austrolittorina araucana is a species of sea snail, a marine gastropod mollusk in the family Littorinidae, the winkles or periwinkles. It is found on the Pacific coast of South America.

References

Littorinidae
Gastropods described in 1840